The British marathon athletics champions covers two competitions; the AAA Championships (1925-1982) and the London Marathon from 1983.

Where an international athlete won the AAA Championships or London Marathon the highest ranking UK athlete is considered the National Champion in this list.

Past winners

nc = not contested

References

marathon
British
British Athletics Championships